is a grassy area on a mountain ridge in Japan,  east from Mount Fuji and  south-east from Lake Yamanaka, off of road 147. The area is suitable for hiking and paragliding.

Gliding at Myōjinyama

The paragliding at Myōjinyama requires neither registration nor inscription fee. The launch is shallow, thus suitable for novice pilots. The  area can be used for both launches and landings. There is also an additional free landing zone courtesy of the Minami Green Hill Resort in the vicinity of Lake Yamanaka. Other landing areas include most of the coast of Lake Yamanaka and the multiple tennis courts and football fields that can serve for an emergency landing.

The best launch conditions are with a western to northern wind; so, the site is complementary to Gotenba Gogome and Zubashiri at Mt. Fuji, which is a 30-minute to drive from Myōjinyama. Lake Yamanaka makes the lift smooth; but at other wind directions, the lift is bumpy.

References

Geography of Japan